Once You Give Away Your Heart is a 1929 German comedy film directed by Johannes Guter and starring Lilian Harvey, Igo Sym, and Harry Halm. Made at the time of the conversion to sound film, it was released in both sound and silent versions.

The film's art direction was by Heinz Fenchel and Jacek Rotmil. It was shot at the Babelsberg Studios and on location in Tenerife and on board a cargo steamer sailing from Hamburg.

Synopsis
A young woman escapes from the banana plantation in Borneo where she lives and travels on a cargo ship to Europe.

Cast

References

Bibliography

External links 
 

1929 films
Films of the Weimar Republic
1920s German-language films
Films directed by Johannes Guter
UFA GmbH films
Transitional sound comedy films
German black-and-white films
Films based on German novels
Films set in Hamburg
Films shot in Hamburg
Films shot in Spain
Films shot at Babelsberg Studios
Seafaring films
1929 comedy films
German comedy films
1920s German films